Rafik is the given name of:

Rafik Al-Hariri (1944–2005), business tycoon, former Prime Minister of Lebanon
Rafik Bouderbal (born 1987), French-born Algerian player currently playing for ES Sétif in the Algerian Championnat National
Rafik Deghiche (born 1983), Algeria) Algerian football player currently playing as a forward for USM Alger in the Algerian league
Rafik Djebbour (born 1984), French-born Algerian football player currently playing as a striker for AEK Athens in the Greek Super League
Rafik Haj Yahia (1949–2000), Israeli Arab politician, member of the Knesset for the Labor Party and One Nation
Rafik Halliche (born 1986), Algerian footballer who currently plays for C.D. Nacional in the Portuguese first division
Rafik Kamalov, popular imam in Kyrgyzstan who was shot and killed 7 August 2006, in Osh, by Kyrgyz special forces
Rafik Khachatryan (1937–1993), Armenian sculptor
Rafik Khalifa (born 1966), Algerian businessman living in London
Rafik Saïfi (born 1975), Algerian professional football player who is currently playing for FC Istres
Rafik Schami (born 1946), Syrian-German author, storyteller and critic

It may also refer to:
Abdessamad Rafik (born 1982), Moroccan football player who plays for Al-Wahda
Vlado Goreski, Macedonian artist using the stage name Rafik

See also
Rafik Hariri University Hospital, formerly known as Beirut Governmental University Hospital (BGUH)
Rafik Sorman, Libyan football club based in Sorman, Libya
Rafik Sorman Stadium, multi-purpose stadium in Sorman, Libya